No Path Through Fire is a 1968 Soviet war film directed by Gleb Panfilov. The film won the Golden Leopard at the Locarno International Film Festival.

Plot
The film is set during the Russian Civil War on a hospital train which is transporting the wounded from the front. A homely and awkward girl, Tanya Tyotkina, who is working as a nurse on the train, suddenly discovers the talent of an artist in herself. In this journey she finds her first timid love and transfers her clandestine feelings to paper.

Cast
 Inna Churikova as Tanya Tyotkina
 Anatoly Solonitsyn as Commissar Yevstryukov
 Mikhail Gluzsky as Fokich
 Maya Bulgakova as Maria
 Anatoli Marenich as Morozik
 Vladimir Kashpur as Kolka
 Yevgeni Lebedev as Colonel
 Mikhail Kononov as Alyosha
 Vadim Beroev as Vasya
 Mikhail Kokshenov as Zotik
 Lyubov Malinovskaya as Mother

Production
The film was shot at the station Bezlesnaya near Murom (Vladimir Oblast).

References

External links
 

1968 films
1968 drama films
1960s war drama films
1960s Russian-language films
Golden Leopard winners
Soviet black-and-white films
Films directed by Gleb Panfilov
Soviet war drama films
Lenfilm films